Ulf Nilsson may refer to:

Ulf Nilsson (author) (born 1948), Swedish writer
Ulf Nilsson (ice hockey) (born 1950), Swedish ice hockey player 
Ulf Nilsson (politician) (born 1945), Swedish politician and Member of Parliament
Ulf Nilsson (sailor) (born 1948), Swedish Olympic sailor